Stuart Hunter Ferguson (born 13 October 1974) is an American-born English solicitor and former first-class cricketer.

Ferguson was born in the United States at Sonoma, California in October 1974. Moving to England, he was educated at Nottingham High School before going up to Mansfield College, Oxford. While studying at Oxford, he made a single appearance in first-class cricket for Oxford University against Warwickshire at Oxford in 1998. Ferguson took three wickets in the match with his right-arm medium-fast bowling, dismissing Mike Powell, Dominic Ostler and Dougie Brown in the Warwickshire first innings. He batted once in the match, scoring 2 runs in the Oxford first innings before being dismissed for 2 runs by Neil Smith. After graduating from Oxford, he became a solicitor and was admitted to practice in April 2003.

References

External links

1974 births
Living people
People from Sonoma, California
People educated at Nottingham High School
Alumni of Mansfield College, Oxford
English cricketers
Oxford University cricketers
English solicitors